Robert Fechner (March 22, 1876 – December 31, 1939) was a national labor union leader and director of the Civilian Conservation Corps (1933–39), which played a central role in the development of state and national parks in the United States. 

Born in Chattanooga, Tennessee, with only a public school elementary education he rose to become an American labor union leader and vice president of the International Association of Machinists. He had a reputation for fairness, tact, and patience in all his dealings. On April 5, 1933 he was appointed by President Franklin Delano Roosevelt to be the Director of the Civilian Conservation Corps (CCC). It was Fechner's fairness and ability for organization and administration that impressed the president to his appointment as director. Although he had been an important labor figure, Fechner objected to attempts of union organizers to form unions among CCC enrollees in the camps. He felt that the government was doing all it possibly could for the well-being of the enrollees: well fed, supporting dependents with monthly earnings, getting an education; and they were contributing in a constructive manner to the conservation needs of the nation. The need for a union in this situation was not necessary, and he issued orders to keep union organizers out of the CCC camps and gave instructions that if any of the CCC enrolees joined a union they were to be discharged. Upon Fechner's death while still serving as CCC Director he was succeeded by James McEntee.Fechner's likeness appeared on the cover of Time magazine on February 6, 1939. He was buried in Arlington National Cemetery.

References

External links
 Into the Woods: The First Year of the Civilian Conservation Corps
 Time cover, February 6, 1939
 Robert Fechner grave in Arlington National Cemetery

1876 births
1939 deaths
American trade union leaders
Civilian Conservation Corps people
People from Chattanooga, Tennessee
International Association of Machinists and Aerospace Workers people
Burials at Arlington National Cemetery